Bramshott Military Camp, often simplified to Camp Bramshott, was a temporary army camp set up on Bramshott Common, Hampshire, England during both the First and Second World Wars.

Camp Bramshott was one of three facilities in the Aldershot Command area established by the Canadian Army. The permanent facility on both occasions was at the British Army's Bordon Military Camp. Bramshott was one of two temporary camps set-up for additional accommodation in the lead-up to D-Day, along with Witley Camp.

There were five Canadian camps in the immediate vicinity of Camp Bramshott, each one given the name of one of the Great Lakes:
 Huron and Ontario Camps were located on Bramshott Common near the Portsmouth Road
 Superior Camp was located at the Grayshott end of Ludshott Common
 Erie Camp was located at Headley Down, in the area now occupied by Heatherlands estate.
 Connaught Military Hospital was located on Bramshott Common, adjacent to the A3 Trunk road

There is a memorial to the Canadian troops which comprises, according to the Imperial War Museum's dedication page:

References

External links 
 The Canadian Army Comes to Aldershot
 John Owen Smith's description of the camps at BBC's "WW2's People's War" 

Military history of Canada during World War II
Military history of Surrey
Military history of Canada during World War I